Phyllonorycter anderidae is a moth of the family Gracillariidae. The species was first described by W. H. B. Fletcher in 1885. It is found from Fennoscandia and northern Russia to Belgium, Austria and Ukraine and from Great Britain to southern Russia.

The wingspan is 5.5-6.5 mm. Adults are on wing in May and August in two generations.

The larvae feed on Betula humilis, Betula nana and Betula pubescens. They mine the leaves of their host plant. They create a small lower-surface tentiform mine. The epidermis is pale green and rather weakly folded. The pupa is found in the mine without a cocoon.

References

External links
Fauna Europaea
Bladmineerders.nl

anderidae
Moths of Europe
Moths of Asia
Moths described in 1885